Kurt Sternberg (19 June 1885 – 21 September 1942) was a German philosopher and author.

Sternberg, who was Jewish, fled to the Netherlands in 1939 to escape the National Socialists. He was nonetheless detained and sent to the  Westerbork concentration camp and from there, to Auschwitz, where he perished in September 1942.

There is a stolperstein in memory of Sternberg at Uhlandstraße 175 in the Charlottenburg neighborhood of Berlin.

Selected literary works 
 Versuch einer Entwicklungsgeschichte des kantischen Denkens bis zur Grundlegung des Kritizismus (1909) 
 Neukantische Aufgaben (1931) 
 Die Geburt des Etwas aus dem Nichts, Pan-Verlagsgesellschaft, Berlin (1933) 
 Philosophische Probleme im biblischen und apokryphen Schrifttum der Juden, Berlin, Goldstein (1938)

References

External links 

20th-century German philosophers
1885 births
1942 deaths
Jewish philosophers
German people who died in Auschwitz concentration camp
German civilians killed in World War II
Writers from Berlin
German male writers
German Jews who died in the Holocaust
Lists of stolpersteine in Germany